Lieutenant General Lord Frederick Paulet,  (12 May 1810 – 1 January 1871) was a senior British Army officer.

Military career
Born the fifth son of the Marquess of Winchester, Paulet was commissioned into the Coldstream Guards. He served in the Crimean War and fought at the Battle of Alma, the Battle of Balaklava and the Battle of Inkerman as well as the Siege of Sevastopol.

In 1858 he attended the marriage of Princess Victoria and Prince Frederick in his capacity as The Field Officer in Brigade Waiting. He became Major General commanding the Brigade of Guards in 1863. His last role was as Comptroller and Equerry to the Duchess of Cambridge, a role he was appointed to in 1867.

He also became Colonel of the 32nd Regiment of Foot in 1868. He was promoted to lieutenant general in 1870, and died unmarried in 1871.

References

 

|-

1810 births
1871 deaths
32nd Regiment of Foot officers
British Army lieutenant generals
Companions of the Order of the Bath
Coldstream Guards officers
Younger sons of marquesses
Frederick
British Army personnel of the Crimean War
Equerries